Thomas Smythe (c. 1558 – 1625) was an English merchant and politician.

Thomas Smythe may also refer to:
Thomas Smythe (customer) (1522–1591), English collector of customs duties
Sir Thomas Smyth, 2nd Baronet (died 1732), British Army officer and politician
Thomas Smythe, 1st Viscount Strangford (1599–1635), viscount in the Peerage of England
 Thomas Smythe (artist), (1825–1906) English artist based in Suffolk

See also
Thomas Smith (disambiguation)
Thomas Smyth (disambiguation)